Vincent William "Vince" Heinrich (born 12 February 1934) was a rugby union player who represented Australia. His brother Ted was also an Australian rugby union representative player.

Heinrich, a flanker, was born in Sydney and claimed a total of 2 international rugby caps for Australia.

References

Published sources
 Howell, Max (2006) Born to Lead – Wallaby Test Captains (2005) Celebrity Books, New Zealand

Australian rugby union players
Australia international rugby union players
1934 births
Living people
Rugby union flankers
Rugby union players from Sydney